The 1991 John Hancock Bowl was a college football bowl game played at Sun Bowl Stadium in El Paso, Texas between the University of Illinois Fighting Illini and the University of California, Los Angeles on December 31, 1991. The game was the final contest of the 1991 NCAA Division I-A football season for both teams, and ended in a 6–3 victory for UCLA.  Illinois and UCLA previously met in post-season at the 1984 Rose Bowl, in which UCLA upset #4 Illinois, 45–9.

Game summary 
The Illini were playing their first game under new head coach Lou Tepper, who was named John Mackovic's replacement a little more than two weeks earlier when Mackovic took the head coaching job at Texas. The Illinois defense certainly came to play, holding the high-octane UCLA attack to just 268 yards of total offense. The Fighting Illini offense didn't fare much better, though, totaling 308 yards of its own in a classic defensive struggle. Illinois missed an early scoring opportunity when Jason Verduzco's pass was intercepted at the Bruin goal line. The Illinois defense forced a UCLA fumble six plays later, but then promptly turned the ball back to the Bruins at the UI 24-yard line after a blocked punt. The Illinois defense stiffened and held UCLA to a field goal. Both teams traded punches until Illinois freshman Chris Richardson kicked a 27-yard field goal. The score remained tied until the opening drive of the fourth quarter when Illinois' Filmel Johnson fumbled a UCLA punt at the UI 11-yard line that lead to a 19-yard Louis Perez field goal. Illinois linebacker Mike Poloskey earned the Jimmy Rogers Jr. Trophy as the game's Most Valuable Lineman.

Scoring summary

Statistical summary
Team statistics

(Rushing-Passing-Total): UI - 119-189-308; UCLA - 92-176-268.

Individual statistical leaders

Rushing (Att.-Yds.-TD): UI - Steve Feagin 12-71-0; UCLA - Kevin Williams 24-52-0.

Passing (Att.-Comp.-Int.-TD-Yds.): UI - Jason Verduzco 38-17-3-0-189; UCLA - Tommy Maddox 28-17-1-0-176.

Receiving (No.-Yds.-TD): UI - John Wright 9-94-0; UCLA - Sean LaChapelle 5-69-0, Ricky Davis 4-41-0.

Aftermath
 Terry Donahue went on to be a broadcast analyst for CBS for the Sun Bowl. He was inducted into the Sun Bowl Legends at the 2005 Sun Bowl along with Verne Lundquist.

References

John Hancock Bowl
Sun Bowl
Illinois Fighting Illini football bowl games
UCLA Bruins football bowl games
John Hancock Bowl
December 1991 sports events in the United States